Han Ji-hyun (born March 21, 1996) is a South Korean actress and model. She is best known for her role in The Wind Blows (2019). She has gained recognition for her supporting role in The Penthouse: War in Life (2020–2021) and received her first leading role with SBS's Cheer Up (2022).

Personal life
Han was born on March 21, 1996. Han has a younger twin brother named Han Seung-soo who was born two minutes later. Han attends the Korea National University of Arts under the Department of Acting. Prior to her admission, she was known to have passed the university entrance exams for Department of Acting for other universities such as Konkuk University, Dongguk University, Seoul Institute of the Arts, Sungkyunkwan University, Sejong University, and Chung-Ang University.

Career
Han started her career as a model when she was studying in middle school before pursuing acting in high school. On February 24, 2017, it was announced that Han has signed with SBD Entertainment.

On April 17, 2019, Han was cast in the film I Bet Everything in a lead role as Kang Seon-mi. On April 22, Han was cast in JTBC's television series The Wind Blows in a supporting role as Lee Sun-kyung, she made her debut as an actress with the premiere of the series on May 27.

On September 24, 2020, Han was cast in SBS's television series The Penthouse: War in Life in a supporting role as Joo Seok-kyung.

On April 21, 2022, Han was cast in SBS's television series Cheer Up in her first leading television role as Do Hae-yi.

Filmography

Film

Television series

Web series

Discography

Singles

Awards and nominations

References

External links

  
 
 

1996 births
Living people
South Korean film actresses
South Korean television actresses
21st-century South Korean actresses
Actresses from Seoul
Korea National University of Arts alumni